Tazehabad-e Mowlai (also Romanized as Tāzehābād-e Mowlā'ī; also known as Tāzehābād) is a village in Qalkhani Rural District, Gahvareh District, Dalahu County, Kermanshah Province, Iran. In the 2006 census, its population was 54, in 11 families.

References 

Populated places in Dalahu County